Lynch is a surname of English and Irish origin.

A

Alastair Lynch (born 1968), Australian football player
Albert Lynch (1851–1912), Peruvian painter
Allen Lynch (born 1945), American Medal of Honor recipient
Angela Lynch (died 2007), Mayor of Galway
Annie Lynch (1870-1938), Irish-Australian religious, nurse, hospital administrator, provincial

B
Becky Lynch (born 1987), ring name of Irish professional wrestler Rebecca Quin
Benito Lynch (1885–1951), Argentine writer of Irish descent
Benny Lynch (1913–1946), Scottish boxer
Bernárd J. Lynch (born 1947), American Roman Catholic priest and psychotherapist
Blake Lynch (born 1997), American football player
Brian Lynch (basketball) (born 1978), American basketball player
Brian Lynch (musician) (born 1956), American jazz musician
Brian Lynch (public servant) (born 1936), New Zealander diplomat
Brian Lynch (writer) (born 1973), American writer, director, and actor

C
Carolyn Hoff Lynch (1946–2015), an American philanthropist 
Charles Lynch (judge) (1736–1796), Virginia militia officer in the American Revolutionary War and possible inspiration for the word "lynching"
Charles Lynch (politician) (1783–1853), United States politician
Christopher Lynch (businessman), Australian businessman
Cynthia Lynch (born 1971), wrestler

D

Damian Lynch (born 1979), former Irish association footballer
Daniel Lynch (baseball) (born 1996), American baseball player
Daniel Lynch (basketball) (1916–1981), former basketball coach at St. Francis College
David Lynch (born 1946), American film director
Douglas Lynch (disambiguation), several people
Dustin Lynch (born 1985), American singer-songwriter
Drew Lynch (born 1991), American comedian

E

Edele Lynch (born 1978), Irish singer of B*Witched fame
Edward Lynch (disambiguation), several people
Eliza Lynch, mistress of Francisco Solano López, Paraguayan dictator
Eric the Midget (Eric Lynch), American radio personality
Ernesto Guevara De La Serna y Lynch, the full name of Che Guevara 
Enrique Lynch del Solar, Modernist artist from Chile
Evanna Lynch (born 1991), Irish actress, known for her role as Luna Lovegood in the Harry Potter films

F
 Finbar Lynch (born 1959), Irish actor
 Fionán Lynch (1889–1966), Irish politician

G

Genevieve Springston Lynch, a.k.a. Gene Lynch, (1891–1960), American artist
Geoffrey Lynch, aka Geffere Lynch, 4th Mayor of Galway, fl. 1488–1489
George Lynch (basketball), retired American professional basketball player
George Lynch (musician) (born 1954), American heavy metal guitarist with the heavy metal band Dokken
George Lynch (race car driver) (1918–1997)
George Edward Lynch (1917–2003), American Catholic bishop
Gerard Lynch (Irish politician) (born 1931), Irish politician
Gerard E. Lynch (born 1951), American federal judge
Grayston Lynch (1923–2008), American soldier and CIA officer

H
Henry Lynch (1822–1906), founder Lynch Family bellringers of Australia
Henry Finnis Blosse Lynch, British traveller, businessman, and politician
Henry T. Lynch, American physician and cancer researcher 
Holly Lynch (actress), American actress and model
Holly Lynch, British politician

J
Jack Lynch (1917–1999), sports star and fourth Taoiseach of the Republic of Ireland
Jack Lynch (baseball) (1857–1923), American baseball player
James Lynch (disambiguation), several people
Jane Lynch (born 1960), American actress, best known for her work on the TV show Glee
Janelle Lynch, American photographer
Jarvis Lynch (born 1933), American general
Jay Lynch (1945–2017) An American cartoonist
Jennifer Lynch (born 1968), American film director
Jessica Lynch (born 1983), American soldier and prisoner of war
Joe Lynch (actor) (1925–2001), Irish actor
Joe Lynch (boxer) (1898–1965), American boxer
Joel Lynch (born 1987), English footballer
John H. Lynch (born 1952), American politician and governor 
John Lynch (actor), actor from Northern Ireland
John Lynch (American football) (born 1971), American football player
John R. Lynch (1847–1939), black U.S. politician after the American Civil War

K

Kathleen Lynch (disambiguation), several people
Kathy Lynch (born 1957), New Zealand mountain biker
Keavy Lynch (born 1979), Irish singer of B*Witched fame
Kelly Lynch (born 1959), American actress
Kenny Lynch (1938–2019), English singer and actor
Kevin Lynch (hunger striker), Irish republican
Kevin A. Lynch (1918–1984), American urban planner and author
Kevin G. Lynch, Canadian civil servant

L

Lashana Lynch (born 1987), British actress
Liam Lynch (Irish Republican) (1893–1923), Irish general
Liam Lynch (musician) (born 1970), musician, puppeteer, and director
Loretta Lynch (born 1959), 83rd Attorney General of the United States
Louis Lynch (born 1955), American harpist and composer

M
Mark Lynch (English footballer) (born 1981)
Mark Lynch (Gaelic footballer) (born 1986)
Marshawn Lynch (born 1986), American football running back
Michael Lynch (disambiguation), several people
Michelle Lynch (born 1975), cricketer from New Zealand.

N

Nancy Lynch, professor at MIT
Nnenna Lynch, American distance runner
Nicolás Barrios-Lynch, Argentine pioneer of the Rural Libraries movement in South America
Noel Lynch, British politician

O

Karl O'Lynch von Town, Austrian artist
Orlanda Lynch, Surinamese track and field athlete
Owen Lynch, American anthropologist specialising in Dalit studies

P

Patrick Lynch, wealthy Argentinian landowner
Patricio Lynch, Chilean rear-admiral
Patrick Lynch (disambiguation)
Paxton Lynch, American football player
Peirce Lynch, first Mayor of Galway
Peter Lynch (born 1944), investor

Q

Quinten Lynch, Australian Football League player for the West Coast Eagles

R

Ray Lynch (born 1943), American musician
Rayleen Lynch (born c. 1946), retired Australian basketball player
Rachael Lynch (born 1994), Loughborough icon
Richard Lynch, several people
Riker Lynch, American actor and musician 
Robert Clyde Lynch, American physician who developed the Lynch operation
Rocky Lynch, American musician
Ross Lynch, American actor and musician 
Rydel Lynch, American musician

S

Sandra Lea Lynch (born 1946), first woman judge on the United States Court of Appeals for the First Circuit
Scott Lynch (born 1978), American fantasy author
Sean Lynch (disambiguation), various people
Shane Lynch (born 1976), Irish singer of Boyzone fame
Simon Lynch (footballer), Canadian footballer
Stacey Lynch (born 1980), Australian virologist
Stan Lynch, former drummer for Tom Petty and The Heartbreakers
Stephen Lynch (English cricketer) (born 1951)
Stephen Lynch (New Zealand cricketer) (born 1976)
Stephen Lynch (musician) (born 1971), American singer/comedian
Stephen Lynch (politician) (born 1955), American congressman
Stephen Andrew Lynch (born 1882), American businessman
Steve Lynch, guitarist with the American band Autograph
Susan Lynch, actress from Northern Ireland
Susan Lynch (pediatrician), First Lady of New Hampshire
Sybil Lynch, American singer

T
Thaddeus Lynch (1901–1966), Irish politician
Thomas Lynch (disambiguation)

V

Valeria Lynch (born 1952), Argentine singer

W

William Lynch (Lynch law), Virginia citizen
William F. Lynch (1801–1865), American naval officer

See also 
Bet Lynch, fictional character in the British soap opera Coronation Street
Sir Henry Lynch-Blosse, 7th Baronet (1749–1788), Irish politician
Angela Lynch-Lupton (died 2007), twice mayor of Galway
Lynch-Staunton, a list of people with the surname
Anna Lynch-Robinson, costume designer

Lists of people by surname